Ministry of Roads and Transportation may refer to:

 Ministry of Roads and Transportation (Iran)
 Ministry of Roads and Transport (Australia)

See also

 Ministry of Transport